Murrah River is an open mature wave dominated barrier estuary or perennial river located in the South Coast region of New South Wales, Australia.

Course and features

The Princes Highway crosses Murrah River at Quaama, south of Cobargo.

See also

 Rivers of New South Wales
 List of rivers of New South Wales (L-Z)
 List of rivers of Australia

References

External links
 

 
 

Rivers of New South Wales
South Coast (New South Wales)